Don't Look at Me may refer to:

Don't Look at Me (Desperate Housewives)
David Lynch - Don't Look at Me 1989 TV documentary on David Lynch 
"Don't Look at Me", song by Stephen Sondheim from Follies
"Don't Look at Me", chart single by Jimmy Clanton
"Don't Look at Me", single from Genuine (Stacie Orrico album)
"Don't Look at Me", song by Scottish indie rock band The Twilight Sad, from No One Can Ever Know
"Don't Look At Me (I Don't Like It)"  2011 single by The Lovely Eggs